Benoît Peschier (born 21 May 1980 in Guilherand-Granges) is a French-Greek slalom canoeist who competed at the international level from 1997 to 2014. He represented Greece from 2009 to 2010. In 2013 he returned to the international scene representing France.

Peschier won a gold medal in the K1 event at the 2004 Summer Olympics in Athens. He also won two medals in the K1 team event at the ICF Canoe Slalom World Championships with a gold in 2005 and a bronze in 2002.

His younger brother Nicolas is a multiple medalist from world and European championships in canoe slalom. Their father Claude is world champion in the K1 event from 1969.

World Cup individual podiums

References

42-83 from Medal Winners ICF updated 2007.pdf?MenuID=Results/1107/0,Medal_winners_since_1936/1510/0 ICF medalists for Olympic and World Championships - Part 2: rest of flatwater (now sprint) and remaining canoeing disciplines: 1936-2007.

1980 births
Living people
People from Guilherand-Granges
Canoeists at the 2004 Summer Olympics
French male canoeists
Olympic canoeists of France
Olympic gold medalists for France
Olympic medalists in canoeing
Medalists at the 2004 Summer Olympics
Medalists at the ICF Canoe Slalom World Championships
Sportspeople from Ardèche